Octahedrites are the most common structural class of iron meteorites. The structures occur because the meteoric iron has a certain nickel concentration that leads to the exsolution of kamacite out of taenite while cooling.

Structure

Octahedrites derive their name from the crystal structure paralleling an octahedron. Opposite faces are parallel so, although an octahedron has 8 faces, there are only 4 sets of kamacite plates.

Due to a long cooling time in the interior of the parent asteroids, these alloys have crystallized into intermixed millimeter-sized bands (from about 0.2 mm to 5 cm). When polished and acid etched the classic Widmanstätten patterns of intersecting lines of lamellar kamacite, are visible.

In gaps between the kamacite and taenite lamellae, a fine-grained mixture called plessite is often found.  An iron nickel phosphide, schreibersite, is present in most nickel-iron meteorites, as well as an iron-nickel-cobalt carbide, cohenite. Graphite and troilite occur in rounded nodules up to several cm in size.

Subgroups

Octahedrites can be grouped by the dimensions of kamacite lamellae in the Widmanstätten pattern, which are related to the nickel content:
 Coarsest octahedrites, lamellae width >3.3 mm, 5-9% Ni, symbol Ogg
 Coarse octahedrites, lamellae 1.3-3.3 mm, 6.5-8.5% Ni, symbol Og
 Medium octahedrites, lamellae 0.5-1.3 mm, 7-13% Ni, symbol Om
 Fine octahedrites, lamellae 0.2-0.5 mm, 7.5-13% Ni, symbol Of
 Finest octahedrites, lamellae <0.2 mm, 17-18% Ni, symbol Off
 Plessitic octahedrites, kamacite spindles, a transitional structure between octahedrites and ataxites, 9-18% Ni, symbol Opl

Mineral
Octahedrite is an obsolete synonym for anatase, one of the three known titanium dioxide minerals.

See also
 Glossary of meteoritics

References

External links
Webmineral
Meteorites Australia